The fifth season of Chicago P.D., an American police drama television series by executive producer Dick Wolf, premiered on September 27, 2017, and concluded on May 9, 2018. It contains 22 episodes, including the series' 100th. It is the final season featuring Elias Koteas as Alvin Olinsky.

Cast

Regular
 Jason Beghe as Sergeant Henry "Hank" Voight
 Jon Seda as Detective Antonio Dawson
 Jesse Lee Soffer as Detective Jay Halstead
 Tracy Spiridakos as Detective Hailey Upton
 Patrick John Flueger as Officer Adam Ruzek
 Marina Squerciati as Officer Kim Burgess
 LaRoyce Hawkins as Officer Kevin Atwater
 Amy Morton as Desk Sergeant Trudy Platt
 Elias Koteas as Detective Alvin Olinsky

Recurring
 Mykelti Williamson as Lieutenant Denny Woods
 Esai Morales as Chief Lugo
 Chris Agos as Assistant State's Attorney Steve Kot
 Wendell Pierce as Alderman Ray Price
 Anabelle Acosta as Camila Vega
 John Pankow as Judge Tommy Wells
 Michael McGrady as Assistant State's Attorney James Osha

Crossover
 Jesse Spencer as Captain Matthew Casey
 Taylor Kinney as Lieutenant Kelly Severide
 Monica Raymund as Paramedic in Charge Gabriela Dawson
 Eamonn Walker as Chief Wallace Boden
 David Eigenberg as Firefighter Christopher Herrmann
 Christian Stolte as Firefighter Randy "Mouch" McHolland
 Kara Killmer as Paramedic Sylvie Brett
 Joe Minoso as Firefighter Joe Cruz
 Nick Gehlfuss as Dr. Will Halstead
 Yaya DaCosta as April Sexton
 Monica Barbaro as Assistant State's Attorney Anna Valdez
 Lorena Diaz as Nurse Doris

Episodes

Production

Cast changes
On May 25, 2017, it was announced that Sophia Bush would be departing the series, while Jon Seda is set to return after the cancellation of Chicago Justice. After recurring last season as Detective Hailey Upton, Tracy Spiridakos has been promoted to a series regular for this season.

Mykelti Williamson reprises his role of Lieutenant Denny Woods in a recurring role, and Wendell Pierce join the cast as Alderman Ray Price, in a recurring role.

Wil Traval guest stars as Sergeant McGrady, who shares a history with Upton. Anabelle Acosta joins the cast in the recurring role of Camila, and began appearing from episode 7, while Zach Appelman made his debut as Burgess' boyfriend and federal prosecutor, Matt Miller from episode 8.

Ratings

Home media
The DVD release of season five was released in Region 1 on September 11, 2018.

References

External links

2017 American television seasons
2018 American television seasons
Chicago P.D. (TV series) seasons